The 2007 Taraba State gubernatorial election was the 4th gubernatorial election of Taraba State. Held on April 14, 2007, the People's Democratic Party nominee Danbaba Suntai won the election, defeating Ahmed Yusuf of the Action Congress of Nigeria.

Results 
Danbaba Suntai from the People's Democratic Party won the election, defeating Ahmed Yusuf from the Action Congress of Nigeria. Registered voters was 1,173,514.

References 

Taraba State gubernatorial elections
Taraba gubernatorial
April 2007 events in Nigeria